Events in the year 2002 in Eritrea.

Incumbents 

 President: Isaias Afewerki

Events 

 15 March – United Nations Security Council resolution 1398 was adopted unanimously and extended the mandate of the United Nations Mission in Ethiopia and Eritrea (UNMEE) until 15 September 2002.

Deaths

References 

 
2000s in Eritrea
Years of the 21st century in Eritrea
Eritrea
Eritrea